Haeckelia is a genus of ctenophores belonging to the family Cydippida.

The species of this genus are found in Europe and Northern America.

Species:

Haeckelia beehleri 
Haeckelia bimaculata 
Haeckelia filigera 
Haeckelia rubra

References

Tentaculata